Florin Scoica is a Romanian sprint canoer who competed in the mid-1990s to the early 2000s. He won two silver medals at the 1994 ICF Canoe Sprint World Championships in Mexico City, earning them in the K-4 200 m and K-4 500 m events.

References

Living people
Romanian male canoeists
Year of birth missing (living people)
ICF Canoe Sprint World Championships medalists in kayak